Empyray is an Armenian rock group, working in heavy rock, hard rock genres.  Their works are characterized by imposing vocal, surprising melody transitions, thoughtful lyrics in Armenian and English languages and complete, harmonic musical forms.

History
The group was formed in 1993 on initiative of Sargis Manoukyan and Karen Arzumanyan. There have been about 50 concerts since then, but they got wide recognition only in 2005. In 2006 Empyray recorded its debut CD album with 13 tracks in the group's own studio, gave its first solo concert and won Armenian National Music Awards in category "Best Rock Band".

Title etymology 
"Empyray" is the English transliteration of эмпирей - the Slavonic version of Greek empuros (Latin,  empyreus, English empyrean), the highest part of the (supposedly spherical) heavens, thought in ancient times to contain the pure element of fire and by early Christians to be the abode of God and the angels

Band members
Sargis Manoukyan - vocalist, band's manager, graduated from university as an economist, has got 2-year training in vocal under the guidance of Yerevan State Conservatory professor Sergey Danielyan
Karen Arzoumanyan - guitarist, composer, graduated from university as a medical doctor, has got secondary musical education, is the husband of Gisaneh Palyan
Gisaneh Palyan - keyboardist, author of lyrics, graduated from Yerevan State Conservatory as a pianist, is the wife of Karen Arzoumanyan
David Khurshudyan - bass guitarist
Koryun Bobikyan - drummer

Discography

Albums 
 2007 - Sev u Spitak  (Սև ու սպիտակ)
 2009 - Hure  (Հուր է)
 2011 - Mekendmisht  (Մեկընդմիշտ)

DVD 
 2008 - Evolution

References

External links
Empyray, Du chkas clip

Armenian rock music groups
Armenian rock musicians
Musical groups established in 1994
1994 establishments in Armenia